Lake Moses is a lake in Douglas County, in the U.S. state of Minnesota.

Lake Moses was named after Moses from the Hebrew Bible.

References

Lakes of Minnesota
Lakes of Douglas County, Minnesota